The 2018 Silicon Valley Classic (also known as the Mubadala Silicon Valley Classic for sponsorship reasons) was a professional women's tennis tournament played on hard courts. It was the 47th edition of the tournament, and part of the WTA Premier tournaments of the 2018 WTA Tour. It took place between 30 July and 5 August 2018 and was the first time the tournament is held in San Jose, California, following a move from Stanford. It is the first women's event on the 2018 US Open Series.

Points and prize money

Point distribution

Prize money

Singles main-draw entrants

Seeds

 1 Rankings are as of July 23, 2018.

Other entrants
The following players received wildcards into the singles main draw:
  Ashley Kratzer
  Claire Liu
  Garbiñe Muguruza
  Venus Williams

The following player received entry using a protected ranking:
  Serena Williams

The following players received entry from the qualifying draw:
  Amanda Anisimova
  Verónica Cepede Royg
  Georgina García Pérez
  Danielle Lao

The following players received entry as lucky losers:
  Anna Blinkova
  Magdalena Fręch

Withdrawals
  Catherine Bellis → replaced by  Kateryna Bondarenko
  Polona Hercog → replaced by  Sofia Kenin
  Madison Keys → replaced by  Magdalena Fręch
  Garbiñe Muguruza → replaced by  Anna Blinkova
  Anastasia Pavlyuchenkova → replaced by  Heather Watson
  Maria Sharapova → replaced by  Victoria Azarenka
  CoCo Vandeweghe → replaced by  Christina McHale

Retirements
  Victoria Azarenka

Doubles main-draw entrants

Seeds

1 Rankings are as of July 23, 2018.

Other entrants 
The following pair received a wildcard into the main draw:
  Tamara Culibrk /  Sybille Gauvain

Withdrawals 
During the tournament
  Aryna Sabalenka

Finals

Singles

  Mihaela Buzărnescu defeated  Maria Sakkari, 6–1, 6–0

Doubles

  Latisha Chan /  Květa Peschke defeated  Lyudmyla Kichenok /  Nadiia Kichenok, 6–4, 6–1

References

External links
Official website

2018 WTA Tour
2018
Sports in San Jose, California
Tennis tournaments in California
2018 in sports in California
2018 in American tennis
July 2018 sports events in the United States
August 2018 sports events in the United States